In the AFL Women's (AFLW), the Adelaide Club Champion award is awarded to the best and fairest player at the Adelaide Football Club during the home-and-away season. The award has been awarded annually since the competition's inaugural season in 2017, and Erin Phillips was the inaugural winner of the award.

Recipients

See also

 Malcolm Blight Medal (list of Adelaide Football Club best and fairest winners in the Australian Football League)

References

AFL Women's awards
Lists of AFL Women's players
   
Awards established in 2017